Baale may refer to:
 Baale (title), a title used in parts of Nigeria
 Baale language, a language of Ethiopia and South Sudan
 Baale of Judah, a place mentioned in the Bible

See also